Moshe Dvoretzky (alternative spelling "Dvoretzki") (born 1922 in Haskovo, Bulgaria) was a Bulgarian actor. Moshe Dvoretzky was one of the founders of the Dimitrovgrad Theatre. He played dozens of leading parts there and directed several plays. Moshe Dvoretzky also worked as a theatre actor in Haskovo, Plovdiv and Pazardzhik. He played various parts in several Bulgarian films, including "The Sedmaks' Last Supper" (1957), "Past-Master On the Excursion" (1980) and "The Master of Boyana" (1981).

Moshe Dvoretzky died in Sofia in 1988 following an unsuccessful heart bypass operation.

External links 
 

Bulgarian male stage actors
People from Haskovo
1922 births
1988 deaths
Bulgarian people of Jewish descent
20th-century Bulgarian male actors